Style at Home is a monthly interior design magazine published by TI Media. It is edited by Lizzie Hudson.

Early history
The magazine was launched in May 2011 following a successful three-issue pilot.

References

External links
 

Monthly magazines published in the United Kingdom
Cultural magazines published in the United Kingdom
Design magazines
English-language magazines
Magazines established in 2011